Big White Duel is a 2019 Hong Kong television medical drama produced by Marco Law and TVB. It stars Roger Kwok, Kenneth Ma, Natalie Tong, Ali Lee and Kelly Cheung as the main leads. The series follows a team of medical practitioners at the fictional Marshall Paxton Hospital, Hong Kong's leading public hospital, with its central plot structuring around the hospital's Deputy C.E., Dr. YT Yeung's (Roger Kwok) attempts in rallying support for a new healthcare plan that would change the landscape of Hong Kong's healthcare system. Big White Duel premiered on TVB Jade in Hong Kong on 10 June 2019, and aired its final episode on 12 July 2019. It aired on Mediacorp's Channel 8 on 18 March 2020 and concluded on 25 May 2020. A second season was released in 2022.

Big White Duel received critical acclaim throughout its broadcast period. It is currently sitting as Hong Kong's second highest-rated television drama of 2019, and garnered multiple awards and nominations at the StarHub Night of Star Awards and TVB Anniversary Awards, including Best Actor and Best TVB Male Artiste for Kenneth Ma, Best TVB Female Artiste for Natalie Tong, Most Improved Female Artiste for Kelly Cheung and Best Drama.

Series overview
Hong Kong's leading public hospital, Marshall Paxton, is being used as a trial ground for a radical reform project that could potentially change the future of Hong Kong's healthcare system. As medical practitioners at Marshall Paxton regularly face ethical dilemmas that challenge their professionalism, they are also being put in the middle of a power struggle between Deputy C.E. Dr. YT Yeung, who seeks for healthcare reform and for the spot of C.E., and the hospital's current C.E. Dr. Lui Chung-hok, who wants to keep the status quo. Fictional depictions of the Hospital Authority (known in the series as the Medical Development Authority), the Department of Health, and the Legislative Council of Hong Kong (LegCo) are prominent entities that drive the plot.

Plot
It centers on Dr. YT Yeung (Roger Kwok), the Deputy Chief Executive of Marshall Paxton Hospital and his radical proposal to completely change the hospital’s bureaucratic model by privatizing the public hospitals and raise capital by the means of public listing to maintain hospital operations, but is met with opposition from Dr. Tong Ming (Kenneth Ma), who was placed by the Chief Executive of Marshal Paxton to be the head of the hospital’s cardiology department. Tong Ming believed that YT Yeung’s proposed changes could affect the poor’s accessibility to healthcare has a totally different ideology compared to YT's. He has fought alongside his apprentice Dr. Max Poon (Matthew Ho) in accordance with the life-saving principle that is to hold human life above the healthcare system, but they are instead dragged into the power struggle initiated by Dr. Lui Chung-hok, CE of Marshal Paxton. In Marshall Paxton Hospital, Tong Ming is reunited with A&E's Dr. Zoe So (Natalie Tong) who is his ex-wife.

Production
Big White Duel was first announced in late 2017 as a new installment to Marco Law's Strongmen series, which started with the legal drama Law dis-Order in 2016. Initially produced with the working title White Giants (白色巨人), the new series would follow a similar to theme to Law dis-Order, in which career professionals engage in political games to consolidate power. Law employed the same team behind Law dis-Order for Big White Duel, including scriptwriter Wong Wai-keung.

Moses Chan and Ruco Chan were initially sought out to respectively star as Dr. YT Yeung and Dr. Tong Ming. After turning down the roles, TVB cast Roger Kwok and Kenneth Ma in December 2017. Big White Duel became Kwok's last TVB drama in his management contract. The role of Dr. Patrick Lam was first offered to Jason Chan, and then to Oscar Leung, but both turned down the role due to schedule conflicts. The role ultimately went to Stephen Wong.

In February 2018, Big White Duel held its first costume fitting press conference. Filming commenced that same month in Tuen Mun, and later in Shenzhen, China. Principal photography focused on locations in Tuen Mun's T PARK, Shenzhen's Horizontal Skyscraper, and the Qianhai Shenzhen-Hong Kong Youth Innovation and Entrepreneur Hub, which were used as backdrops for Marshall Paxton Hospital. Principal photography ended in July 2018 with a wrap-up party held on 2 July 2018.

Cast and characters

Marshall Paxton Hospital

Government officials

Senior Management

Neuroendovascular Surgery (NES)

Cardiothoracic Surgery (CTS)

Accident & Emergency (A & E)

Nursing

Other cast

Viewership ratings

TVB Jade

International broadcast

Awards and nominations

References

TVB dramas
Hong Kong television series
2010s Hong Kong television series